Thomas Eyre may refer to:

Thomas Eyre (Jesuit) (1670–1715), English Jesuit
Thomas Eyre (divine) (1748–1810), Catholic theologian
Thomas Eyre (MP) (died 1628), MP for Salisbury
 Thomas Eyre, President of Ushaw College, Dublin, 1794–1810
 Thomas Eyre (engineer) (died 1772), Irish military engineer and architect
 Thomas Eyre (footballer) (fl. 1890s), football full back who played for Glasgow Ashfield, Lincoln City and Hamilton Academical
 Thomas Lawrence Eyre (1862–1926), American politician from Pennsylvania

See also